Julia Kendell (born 25 April 1968) is an English interior designer, television presenter and writer.

Biography
Born in Middlesex, Kendell went to Newnham Junior School in Eastcote, and Haydon Secondary School in Northwood.

Career
Aged 14 she began working in a local soft furnishings shop, and developed a career in interior design after being offered the manager's job aged 18. She now specialises in kitchen design, bespoke cabinetry and lighting design and writes for many interiors magazines including Real Homes and House Beautiful. Her signature style is 'rustic contemporary' and her ethos centres on creating practical, beautiful and emotionally connected homes for all. In 2012 she designed the interior of the venue for Nick Knowles and his wife Jessica's wedding in the UK. In  2015 Kendell has collaborated with Danetti UK designing and launching a new range of dining furniture.

Television career
Kendell's first television appearances were for ITV's 60 Minute Makeover for which she made eight series between 2004-2014, most recently co-presenting with Peter Andre. She has also appeared in a two-part special for Tonight with Trevor McDonald highlighting the demolition and refurbishment debate of Victorian housing stock in the UK. In January 2008 Julia took over the role of designer for DIY SOS on BBC One. Three years later Kendell was instrumental in taking SOS to an hour-long 'Big Build' format where the team complete entire house builds over a 9-day period involving an army of trades volunteers. In April 2011, she was the DIY and makeover expert for Daybreak's "Guide to Transforming Your Home", in 2012 she appeared on several episodes of The Alan Titchmarsh Show, and in 2015 'Rebuild Our Home' with Nicky Campbell for ITV.

Personal life
Having moved to Henley on Thames with her first husband, she now lives in the area with her partner, James. She has renovated and built homes in the area including an award-winning self-build eco home constructed in 2008. Julia has two grown-up daughters and a granddaughter. Her passions outside of design include organic vegetable growing, keeping hens and self-sufficiency. She is a prolific cook and enjoys scuba diving and skiing.

References

External links
Official website
60 Minute Makeover ITV.com
DIY SOS BBC1 One

Living people
People from Eastcote
English interior designers
English television presenters
1968 births
Designers from London